Shareef may refer to:

Shareef (given name)
Shareef (surname)

See also

Sharif, title for descendants of Muhammad
Sharif (disambiguation)